In mathematics, specifically in symplectic topology and algebraic geometry, Gromov–Witten (GW) invariants are rational numbers that, in certain situations, count pseudoholomorphic curves meeting prescribed conditions in a given symplectic manifold. The GW invariants may be packaged as a homology or cohomology class in an appropriate space, or as the deformed cup product of quantum cohomology. These invariants have been used to distinguish symplectic manifolds that were previously indistinguishable. They also play a crucial role in closed type IIA string theory. They are named after Mikhail Gromov and Edward Witten.

The rigorous mathematical definition of Gromov–Witten invariants is lengthy and difficult, so it is treated separately in the stable map article. This article attempts a more intuitive explanation of what the invariants mean, how they are computed, and why they are important.

Definition
Consider the following:
X: a closed symplectic manifold of dimension 2k, 
A: a 2-dimensional homology class in X, 
g: a non-negative integer,
n: a non-negative integer. 
Now we define the Gromov–Witten invariants associated to the 4-tuple: (X, A, g, n). Let  be the Deligne–Mumford moduli space of curves of genus g with n marked points and  denote the moduli space of stable maps into X of class A, for some chosen almost complex structure J on X compatible with its symplectic form.
, 
where C is a (not necessarily stable) curve with n marked points x1, ..., xn and f : C → X is pseudoholomorphic. The moduli space has real dimension

Let

denote the stabilization of the curve. Let

which has real dimension . There is an evaluation map

In a sense, this homology class is the Gromov–Witten invariant of X for the data g, n, and A. It is an invariant of the symplectic isotopy class of the symplectic manifold X.

These induce homology classes in Y by the Künneth formula. Let

where  denotes the intersection product in the rational homology of Y. This is a rational number, the Gromov–Witten invariant for the given classes.

Put simply, a GW invariant counts how many curves there are that intersect n chosen submanifolds of X. However, due to the "virtual" nature of the count, it need not be a natural number, as one might expect a count to be. For the space of stable maps is an orbifold, whose points of isotropy can contribute noninteger values to the invariant.

There are numerous variations on this construction, in which cohomology is used instead of homology, integration replaces intersection, Chern classes pulled back from the Deligne–Mumford space are also integrated, etc.

Computational techniques
Gromov–Witten invariants are generally difficult to compute. While they are defined for any generic almost complex structure J, for which the linearization D of the operator is surjective, they must actually be computed with respect to a specific, chosen J. It is most convenient to choose J with special properties, such as nongeneric symmetries or integrability. Indeed, computations are often carried out on Kähler manifolds using the techniques of algebraic geometry.

However, a special J may induce a nonsurjective D and thus a moduli space of pseudoholomorphic curves that is larger than expected. Loosely speaking, one corrects for this effect by forming from the cokernel of D a vector bundle, called the obstruction bundle, and then realizing the GW invariant as the integral of the Euler class of the obstruction bundle. Making this idea precise requires significant technical argument using Kuranishi structures.

The main computational technique is localization. This applies when X is toric, meaning that it is acted upon by a complex torus, or at least locally toric. Then one can use the Atiyah–Bott fixed-point theorem, of Michael Atiyah and Raoul Bott, to reduce, or localize, the computation of a GW invariant to an integration over the fixed-point locus of the action.

Another approach is to employ symplectic surgeries to relate X to one or more other spaces whose GW invariants are more easily computed. Of course, one must first understand how the invariants behave under the surgeries. For such applications one often uses the more elaborate relative GW invariants, which count curves with prescribed tangency conditions along a symplectic submanifold of X of real codimension two.

Related invariants and other constructions
The GW invariants are closely related to a number of other concepts in geometry, including the Donaldson invariants and Seiberg–Witten invariants in the symplectic category, and Donaldson–Thomas theory in the algebraic category. For compact symplectic four-manifolds, Clifford Taubes showed that a variant of the GW invariants (see Taubes's Gromov invariant) are equivalent to the Seiberg–Witten invariants. For algebraic threefolds, they are conjectured to contain the same information as integer valued Donaldson–Thomas invariants. Physical considerations also give rise to Gopakumar–Vafa invariants, which are meant to give an underlying integer count to the typically rational Gromov-Witten theory. The Gopakumar-Vafa invariants do not presently have a rigorous mathematical definition, and this is one of the major problems in the subject. 

The Gromov-Witten invariants of smooth projective varieties can be defined entirely within algebraic geometry. The classical enumerative geometry of plane curves and of rational curves in homogeneous spaces are both captured by GW invariants. However, the major advantage that GW invariants have over the classical enumerative counts is that they are invariant under deformations of the complex structure of the target. The GW invariants also furnish deformations of the product structure in the cohomology ring of a symplectic or projective manifold; they can be organized to construct the quantum cohomology ring of the manifold X, which is a deformation of the ordinary cohomology. The associativity of the deformed product is essentially a consequence of the self-similar nature of the moduli space of stable maps that are used to define the invariants. 

The quantum cohomology ring is known to be isomorphic to the symplectic Floer homology with its pair-of-pants product.

Application in physics
GW invariants are of interest in string theory, a branch of physics that attempts to unify general relativity and quantum mechanics. In this theory, everything in the universe, beginning with the elementary particles, is made of tiny strings. As a string travels through spacetime it traces out a surface, called the worldsheet of the string. Unfortunately, the moduli space of such parametrized surfaces, at least a priori, is infinite-dimensional; no appropriate measure on this space is known, and thus the path integrals of the theory lack a rigorous definition.

The situation improves in the variation known as closed A-model. Here there are six spacetime dimensions, which constitute a symplectic manifold, and it turns out that the worldsheets are necessarily parametrized by pseudoholomorphic curves, whose moduli spaces are only finite-dimensional. GW invariants, as integrals over these moduli spaces, are then path integrals of the theory. In particular, the free energy of the A-model at genus g is the generating function of the genus g GW invariants.

See also 

 Cotangent complex - for deformation theory
 Schubert calculus

References
 An analytically flavoured overview of Gromov–Witten invariants and quantum cohomology for symplectic manifolds, very technically complete

Further reading 
Moduli Spaces of Genus-One Stable Maps, Virtual Classes and an Exercise of Intersection Theory - Andrea Tirelli
 A nice introduction with history and exercises to the formal notion of moduli space, treats extensively the case of projective spaces using the basics in the language of schemes.

Notes on stable maps and quantum cohomology

Research articles 

 Gromov-Witten theory of schemes in mixed characteristic

Symplectic topology
Algebraic geometry
String theory
Moduli theory